Marco Antonio Beltrán García (born May 18, 1986) is a Mexican mixed martial artist who competes mainly in the bantamweight division. A professional mixed martial artist since 2008, Beltrán has also competed in the Ultimate Fighting Championship (UFC).

Early life
Beltrán was born in Mexico City. At age of 3, he moved to Morelia, Michoacán, where he lived until begin to compete for the Ultimate Fighting Championship. During the phase of middle school, he was a practitioner of boxing. Later on his life, Marco Beltrán began his mixed martial arts training at the Top Brother México in Morelia.

Mixed martial arts career

Early career
Beltrán became a professional mixed martial arts fighter in 2008. He won his MMA debut fight by submitting Christian Martínez on August 16, 2008.

After this victory, he entered in a five-fight winning streak which finished in 2012 when Beltrán was submitted by Israel Girón in the Xtreme Kombat 15 event.

On his following bout, Beltrán faced up Rodolfo Rubio. He lost the fight via first-round submission.

He lost his third fight in a row when Diego Huerto beat him by technical knockout in a World Best Gladiators event held in Ciudad Cuauhtémoc, Chihuahua. Following that fight, he tried out for The Ultimate Fighter in 2014.

The Ultimate Fighter: Latin America
In May 2014, it was revealed that Beltrán was a cast member of The Ultimate Fighter: Latin America, competing for Team Velasquez.

In his first bout on the show, Beltrán defeated Guido Cannetti via majority decision.

In the semi-finals, Beltrán was defeated by José Alberto Quiñonez via unanimous decision.

Ultimate Fighting Championship
Beltrán made his official debut against fellow castmate Marlon Vera on November 15, 2014, at UFC 180. He won the fight via unanimous decision.

Beltrán next faced Ning Guangyou on November 28, 2015, at UFC Fight Night 79. He won the fight via split decision.

Beltrán faced Reginaldo Vieira on July 7, 2016, at UFC Fight Night 90. After knocking Vieira down, Beltrán won the fight via submission in the second round.

Beltrán was expected to face former TUF: Latin America opponent Guido Cannetti on November 5, 2016, at The Ultimate Fighter Latin America 3 Finale. However, on October 29, Cannetti was pulled from the bout after USADA revealed a potential anti-doping violation from a sample taken October 15. Beltrán instead faced Joe Soto. He lost the fight via submission in the first round.

Beltrán faced promotional newcomer Deiveson Alcântara in a flyweight bout on June 3, 2017, at UFC 212. He lost the fight via TKO at the end of the second round.

Beltrán faced Matt Schnell on October 7, 2017, at UFC 216. He lost the fight by unanimous decision and was subsequently released from the promotion.

Post-UFC career

Lux Bantamweight Champion
After his stint in the UFC, Beltrán returned to his native Mexican circuit by signing with Lux Fight League. He made his promotional debut against Erick Rogelio Ruano Barrera for the Lux Bantamweight Championship at Lux Fight League 4 on March 15, 2019. He won the fight via fourth-round technical knockout.

Beltrán then attempted to become a two-division champion in the organization by challenging Diego Lopes at Lux Fight League 7 on November 29, 2019. However he lost the fight via first-round submission.

He was then scheduled to make his first Bantamweight title defense against David Mendoza at Lux Fight League 9 on July 17, 2020. He retained his title via fourth-round submission.

The pair was pitted against each other in a rematch for the title at Lux Fight League 14 on June 25, 2021. Beltrán again retained the title via first-round submission.

Beltrán was expected to defend his belt against Francesco Patron Manzo at Lux Fight League 17 on October 15, 2021. However, the fight was later scrapped.

Beltrán faced Jose Roura on June 17, 2022, at Lux Fight League 23. He defended his Bantamweight title and won the bout via unanimous decision.

Beltrán faced Rudolfo Rubio Perez on December 9, 2022, at Lux Fight League 29, collecting a fourth Bantamweight title defense when he won the bout via unanimous decision.

Ares FC
Beltrán signed a 4 bout deal with Ares FC, and faced Damien Lapilus for the vacant AFC Featherweight Championship on March 9, 2023 on Ares FC 13, losing the bout in the first round via TKO stoppage.

Championships and accomplishments
Lux Fight League
Lux Fight League Bantamweight Championship (one time; current)
Four successful title defenses

Mixed martial arts record

|-
|Loss
|align=center|14–8
|Damien Lapilus
|TKO (punches)
|Ares FC 13
|
|align=center|1
|align=center|1:38
|Paris, France
|
|-
|Win
|align=center|14–7
|Jose Roura
|Decision (unanimous)
|Lux Fight League 29
|
|align=center|5
|align=center|5:00
|Mexico City, Mexico
|
|-
|Win
|align=center|13–7
|Rodolfo Rubio Perez
|Decision (unanimous)
|Lux Fight League 23
|
|align=center|5
|align=center|5:00
|Puebla, Mexico
|
|-
|Win
|align=center|12–7
|David Mendoza
|Submission (rear-naked choke)
|Lux Fight League 14
|
|align=center|1
|align=center|4:24
|Monterrey, Mexico
|
|-
|Win
|align=center|11–7
|David Mendoza
|Submission (shoulder choke)
|Lux Fight League 9
|
|align=center|4
|align=center|2:01
|Monterrey, Mexico
|
|-
|Loss
|align=center|10–7
|Diego Lopes
|Submission (kneebar)
|Lux Fight League 7
|
|align=center|1
|align=center|3:35
|Monterrey, Mexico
|
|-
|Win
|align=center|10–6
|Erick Rogelio Ruano Barrera
|TKO (punches)
|Lux Fight League 4
|
|align=center|4
|align=center|4:23
|Mexico City, Mexico
|
|-
|Loss
|align=center|9–6
|Matt Schnell
|Decision (unanimous)
|UFC 216 
|
|align=center|3
|align=center|5:00
|Las Vegas, Nevada, United States
|
|-
|Loss
|align=center|9–5
|Deiveson Figueiredo
|TKO (corner stoppage)
|UFC 212
|
|align=center|2
|align=center|5:00
|Rio de Janeiro, Brazil
|
|-
|Loss
|align=center|9–4
|Joe Soto
|Submission (heel hook)
|The Ultimate Fighter Latin America 3 Finale: dos Anjos vs. Ferguson
|
|align=center|1
|align=center|1:37
|Mexico City, Mexico
|
|-
|Win
|align=center|9–3
|Reginaldo Vieira
| Submission (rear-naked choke)
|UFC Fight Night: dos Anjos vs. Alvarez
|
|align=center|2
|align=center|3:04
|Las Vegas, Nevada, United States
|
|-
|Win
|align=center|8–3
|Ning Guangyou 
|Decision (split)
|UFC Fight Night: Henderson vs. Masvidal
|
|align=center|3
|align=center|5:00
|Seoul, South Korea
| 
|-
|Win
|align=center| 7–3
|Marlon Vera
|Decision (unanimous)
|UFC 180
|
|align=center| 3
|align=center| 5:00
|Mexico City, Mexico
|
|-
|Loss
|align=center| 6–3
|Diego Arturo Huerto
|TKO (head kick)
|WBG 1
|
|align=center| 2
|align=center|N/A
|Ciudad Cuauhtémoc, Mexico
|
|-
|Loss
|align=center| 6–2
|Rodolfo Rubio Perez
|Submission (heel hook)
|MFC 1
|
|align=center| 1
|align=center| N/A
|Naucalpan, Mexico
|
|-
|Loss
|align=center| 6–1
|Israel Giron
|Submission (armbar)
|Xtreme Kombat 15
|
|align=center| 2
|align=center| 4:57
|Mexico City, Mexico
|
|-
|Win
|align=center| 6–0
|Ivan Pineda
|Submission (rear-naked choke)
|Xtreme Kombat 12
|
|align=center| 1
|align=center| 1:15
|Mexico City, Mexico
|
|-
|Win
|align=center| 5–0
|Israel Fernandez
|TKO (doctor stoppage)
|Xtreme Fighters Latino
|
|align=center| 1
|align=center| 2:06
|Guanajuato, Mexico
|
|-
|Win
|align=center| 4–0
|Erick Manzanero
|Submission (armbar)
|GEOC 4
|
|align=center| 1
|align=center| 3:19
|León, Mexico
|
|-
|Win
|align=center| 3–0
|Greg Guzman
|TKO (punches)
|Cage of Fire 14
|
|align=center| 1
|align=center| 4:22
|Guadalajara, Mexico
|
|-
|Win
|align=center| 2–0
|Josue Silva
|TKO (punches)
|GEOC 3
|
|align=center| 2
|align=center| 1:08
|León, Mexico
|
|-
|Win
|align=center| 1–0
|Christian Martinez
|Submission (armbar)
|GEOC 1
|
|align=center| 1
|align=center| 3:01
|León, Mexico
|
|-

References

External links

Living people
Mexican male mixed martial artists
Bantamweight mixed martial artists
Mixed martial artists utilizing boxing
Sportspeople from Mexico City
Sportspeople from Morelia
1986 births
Ultimate Fighting Championship male fighters